Derrick Lehmer may refer to:

 Derrick Henry Lehmer (1905-1991), American mathematician and number theorist
 Derrick Norman Lehmer (1867-1938), American mathematician and number theorist